Pediasia hispanica is a species of moth in the family Crambidae. It is found in Portugal and Spain.

The length of the forewings is about 12 mm. The forewings are dark brown with faint veins. The hindwings are light grey with a white base.

References

Moths described in 1956
Crambini
Moths of Europe